Rottenführer was a Nazi Party paramilitary rank that was first created in the year 1932.  The rank of Rottenführer was used by several Nazi paramilitary groups, among them the Sturmabteilung (SA), the Schutzstaffel (SS) and was senior to the paramilitary rank of Sturmmann.

The insignia for Rottenführer consisted of two double silver stripes on a bare collar patch. On field grey SS uniforms, the sleeve chevrons of an Obergefreiter (senior lance-corporal) were also worn.

Creation
Rottenführer was first established in 1932 as an SA rank due to an expansion of the organisation requiring a greater number of enlisted positions.  Since early SS ranks were identical to the ranks of the SA, Rottenführer became an SS rank at the same time.

Rottenführer was the first SS and SA position to have command over other paramilitary troops. They commanded a rotte (equal to a squad or section) usually numbering no more than five to seven persons. A Rottenführer, in turn, answered to a Scharführer.

After 1934, a restructure of SS ranks made Rottenführer junior to the new rank of SS-Unterscharführer, although in the SA the rank continued to rate immediately below that of Scharführer.

Uses

Within the Waffen-SS, Rottenführer was considered equivalent to an Obergefreiter in the German Wehrmacht.  For pay purposes, a Rottenführer with more than five years of service was administratively known as Rottenführer (2. Gehaltsstufe) and paid the same rate as an Army Stabsgefreiter.  There was no difference in the Rottenführer insignia and the Gehaltsstufe designation was only used in written correspondence and never in verbal addressing of rank.

While having command over some troops, a Rottenführer in the Waffen-SS was not considered a non-commissioned officer rank.

Those aspiring for promotion above Rottenführer were required to pass a promotion evaluation and combat skills assessment, during which time the Rottenführer was known by the title Unterführer-Anwärter.  Waffen-SS Rottenführer also had the option to pursue an officer's commission through appointment as SS-Junker.

Rottenführer was also a rank of the Hitler Youth where the position was considered a junior squad leader title.  A rank of Oberrottenführer also existed in the Hitler Youth.

Insignia

See also 
 Table of ranks and insignia of the Waffen-SS

Notes

Bibliography 

 
 
 
 

SS ranks